Thaikku Thalaimagan is a 1967 Indian Tamil-language drama film, directed by M. A. Thirumugam. The film stars M. G. Ramachandran, Jayalalithaa and S. A. Ashokan. It was released on 13 January 1967.

Plot 

Within a peaceful family garage, The Marudhachalam Murthi Automobiles, a drama is slowly but surely being formed. Indeed, Somaiya, the elder son of this small company aims and aspires to unreal perspectives. Whereas Marudhu, the younger brother behaves in a reflexive way, clearly more responsible. But contrary to all expectations, their mother sides with her first-born, blinded by her love, she supports him in everything, while making her youngest son feel guilty, ceaselessly. As if it was not enough, Somaiya became infatuated with a beautiful bitchy girl, Nalini who sees more in his money than in the beautiful eyes.

Cast 
 M. G. Ramachandran as Marudhu (alias Marudhur)
 S. V. Ranga Rao as Cholaiya Pannaiyar Dharmalingham
 S. A. Ashokan as Somu (alias Somaiya)
 Nagesh as Kuppu
 R. S. Manohar as Ranga)
 Sandow M. M. A. Chinnappa Thevar as a close friend of Meenakshi's family
 Jayalalithaa as Malathi
 Sowcar Janaki as Gauri
 Manorama as Munimma
 S. N. Lakshmi as Meenakshi
 Baby R. Geetha as Mani
 Rajasree (Guest-star) as Nalini

MGR shooting incident 
On 12 January 1967, the day before the release of this film, M. G. Ramachandran was shot in the throat by M. R. Radha.

Soundtrack 
The music was composed by K. V. Mahadevan.

Reception 
Kalki wrote .

References

External links 
 

1960s Tamil-language films
1967 drama films
1967 films
Films directed by M. A. Thirumugam
Films scored by K. V. Mahadevan
Indian drama films